This is a list of electoral results for the electoral district of Deer Park in Victorian state elections.

Members for Deer Park

Election results

Elections in the 1970s

Elections in the 1960s

References

Victoria (Australia) state electoral results by district